The 1932 Centenary Gentlemen football team represented the Centenary College of Louisiana during the 1932 college football season.

Schedule

References

Centenary
Centenary Gentlemen football seasons
College football undefeated seasons
Centenary Gentlemen football